Challakere Kareem Jaffer Sharief (3 November 1933 – 25 November 2018) was an Indian politician. He was one of the senior most Indian National Congress leaders. He was the Railways Minister of the Government of India from 1991 until 1995.

Political career 
Jaffer Sharief started his career in the Indian National Congress under Nijalingappa. After a split in the Congress, he took the side of Indira Gandhi. In 1980 as Railways minister, he was instrumental in gauge conversion of railways in the state, where all or most of the different gauges of tracks were converted to broad gauges, and thereby saving Railways a lot of money. He was also instrumental in getting the Wheel and Axle Plant in Bangalore.

In 2012, Sharief was cleared by the Supreme Court of charges relating to expenditure on a trip to London for medical treatment. Sharief had taken several ministry officials with him, which the court found was not inappropriate. Corruption charges were leveled against him during his tenure as Railway Minister.

Personal life 
Jaffer Sharief lost three members of his family, with his younger son in 1999, his wife in 2008 and his elder son in 2009, three days before his election to Lok Sabha.

CK Jaffer Sharief died at the age of 85 in Bengaluru on 25 November 2018.

References 

|-

|-

|-

|-

External links
Official Biographical Sketch in Lok Sabha Website
 Official website

Indian National Congress politicians from Karnataka
1933 births
2018 deaths
Indian Muslims
20th-century births
Railway Ministers of India
Politicians from Bangalore
India MPs 1971–1977
India MPs 1977–1979
India MPs 1980–1984
India MPs 1984–1989
India MPs 1989–1991
India MPs 1991–1996
India MPs 1998–1999
India MPs 1999–2004
Lok Sabha members from Karnataka
People from Chitradurga